The moss froglet (Crinia nimbus), or moss frog, is a species of frog in the family Myobatrachidae.
It is endemic to Tasmania.
Its natural habitats are moist lowland forests, temperate shrubland, and swamps.

References

Crinia
Amphibians of Tasmania
Taxonomy articles created by Polbot
Amphibians described in 1994
Frogs of Australia